Prodigy Communications Corporation (Prodigy Services Corp., Prodigy Services Co., Trintex) was an online service from 1984 to 2001 that offered its subscribers access to a broad range of networked services, including news, weather, shopping, bulletin boards, games, polls, expert columns, banking, stocks, travel, and a variety of other features.

Prodigy was described by the New York Times as "family-oriented" and one of "the Big Three information services" in 1994.

Initially, subscribers using personal computers accessed the Prodigy service by means of copper wire telephone "POTS" service or X.25 dialup. For its initial roll-out, Prodigy used 1,200 bit/s modem connections. To provide faster service and to stabilize the diverse modem market, Prodigy offered low-cost 2,400 bit/s internal modems to subscribers at a discount. The host systems used were regionally distributed IBM Series/1 minicomputers managed by central IBM mainframes located in Yorktown Heights, New York.

The company claimed it was the first consumer online service, citing its graphical user interface and basic architecture as differentiation from CompuServe, which started in 1979 and used a command-line interface.

By 1990, it was the second-largest (and 1993 the largest) online service provider with 465,000 subscribers, trailing only CompuServe's 600,000. Its headquarters were in White Plains, New York until 2000, when it moved to Austin, Texas.

Early history

The roots of Prodigy date to 1980 when broadcaster CBS and telecommunications firm AT&T Corporation formed a joint venture named Venture One in Fair Lawn, New Jersey. The company conducted a market test of 100 homes in Ridgewood, New Jersey to gauge consumer interest in a Videotex-based TV set-top device that would allow consumers to shop at home and receive news, sports, and weather. After concluding the market test, CBS and AT&T took the data and went their separate ways in pursuit of developing and profiting from this market demand.

Prodigy was founded on February 13, 1984, as Trintex, a joint venture between CBS, computer manufacturer IBM, and retailer Sears, Roebuck and Company. The company was headed by Theodore Papes, a career IBM executive, until his retirement in 1992. CBS left the venture in 1986 when CBS CEO Tom Wyman was divesting properties outside of CBS's core broadcasting business. The company's service was launched regionally in 1988 in Atlanta, Hartford, and San Francisco under the name Prodigy. The marketing roll-out plan closely followed IBM's Systems Network Architecture (SNA) network backbone.  A nationwide launch developed by ad agency J. Walter Thompson and sister company JWT Direct (New York) followed on September 6, 1990.

Thanks to an aggressive media marketing campaign, bundling with various consumer-oriented computers such as IBM's PS/1 and PS/2, as well as various clones and Hayes modems, the Prodigy service soon had more than a million subscribers. To handle the traffic, Prodigy built a national network of POP (points of presence) sites that made local access numbers available for most homes in the US. This was a major factor in the expansion of the service since subscribers did not have to dial long-distance to access the service. The subscriber paid only for the local call (usually free), while Prodigy paid for the connection to its national data center in Yorktown, New York.

Development
Under the guidance of Henry Heilbrunn, Prodigy developed a fully staffed 24×7 newsroom with editors, writers, and graphic artists intent on building the world's first true online medium. The initial result was that Prodigy pioneered the concept of an online content portal—a single site offering news, weather, sports, communication with other members, and shopping for goods and services such as groceries, general merchandise, brokerage services, and airline reservations. The service provided a number of lifestyle features, including popular syndicated columnists, Zagat restaurant surveys, Consumer Reports articles and test reports, games for kids and adults, in-depth original features called "Timely Topics", bulletin boards moderated by subject matter experts, movie reviews, and e-mail. Working with Heilbrunn in the early stages of Prodigy's design, Bob Bedard pioneered the business model for electronic commerce. Prodigy was the service that launched ESPN's online presence.

Prodigy quickly implemented the use of diskette-based application common code modules (predecessor of MS Client Runtime Library (CLR) architecture). These pre-installed diskette-based applications were loaded from the Prodigy Service diskette. These modules then relied upon real-time tokenized data transmitted from Prodigy database servers to drive core Prodigy service functionality on local user PCs. This client-server design worked well, since by staging application-specific and reusable common code modules on Prodigy end-user distribution diskettes, this key design point allowed millisecond "click-to-available-cursor" response times otherwise unachievable in 1986 over slow 1,200-to-2,400 bit/s modems.

The service was presented using a graphical user interface. The Data Object Architecture wrapped vector and incremental point graphics, encoded as per the North American Presentation Level Protocol Syntax NAPLPS, along with interpretative programs written in the proprietary languages TBOL (Trintex Basic Object Language) and PAL (Prodigy Application Language). NAPLPS grew out of the Canadian Telidon project, becoming an international standard in 1983 after some extensions were added by AT&T Corporation. NAPLPS enabled the display of colors and graphics in support of electronic advertising, publishing and commerce. The initial emphasis was on DOS and later Microsoft Windows. Users could use Apple Macintosh, but the Prodigy screens were not always configured to the Mac standard, resulting in wasted space or cut-off graphics.

Prodigy's initial business model relied more on advertising and online shopping for cash flow than monthly subscriptions. Subscribers were charged a flat monthly fee that provided unlimited access. Initially, a monthly rate was charged for unlimited usage time and 30 personal messages. Subscribers could purchase additional messages. Later, Prodigy divided its service into "Core" and "Plus" sections. Core section usage remained unlimited, but Plus sections were limited by usage time. Subscribers were given a monthly allotment of Plus time. If that time was exceeded, the subscriber incurred additional charges based on usage time. Subscribers could discern what type of section they were in by the blue indicator in the bottom-right corner of the screen.

Prodigy's shopping applications initially underperformed relative to expectations. Reasons for difficulty in online shopping for Prodigy included the perception that online shoppers would pay a premium rather than expect discounts for merchandise. Another reason for poor online merchandising was the nature of the graphics presented due to inherent limitations of technology at the time. Using the early NAPLPS graphic standard, it was not possible to render realistic images of products. As such, while commercial clients with presence on the Prodigy Service might have realized a measure of success with an electronic order blank supporting a print catalog, it was otherwise difficult for online merchants to market products.

Despite these challenges, Prodigy was largely responsible for helping merchants such as PC Flowers become some of the earliest e-commerce success stories. However, revenue from advertising was limited.

By 1993, Prodigy was developing a network architecture that would become known in the modern Internet age as a content delivery network, where the network caches its most frequently accessed content as close as possible to the users. The company sold private versions of this for use within a customer's private corporate network.

Price increases
Two of Prodigy's most popular services turned out to be its message boards and email. Because Prodigy's business model depended on rapidly growing advertising and online shopping revenue, email was developed primarily to aid shopping, not for general communication between users, which is what it became. The message boards resulted in users being connected to the service far longer than projected. This resulted in higher than expected expenses, adversely affecting the service's cash flow and profitability.

To control costs and raise revenue, Prodigy took two separate actions. First, in January 1991, Prodigy modified their basic subscriber plans by allowing only 30 email messages free each month, while charging 25 cents for each additional email message—a policy that was later rescinded. In the summer of 1993, it began charging hourly rates for several of its most popular features, including its most popular feature, the message boards. This policy was later rescinded after tens of thousands of members left the service.

The price increases prompted an increase of "underground IDs" (known as 'UG's for shorthand)—where multiple users shared a single account that they turned into private bulletin boards by using emails that were returned (and therefore not billed) due to invalid email addresses. Those invalid addresses were the simple names of the person or people for whom the messages were intended. When those people signed in and checked the email, they would find "returned" messages with their names. They would then "send" a reply by typing the name of the first sender, which would also be returned. When that person logged on next, they would see their message, and the cycle would repeat.

Prodigy was slow to adopt features that made its rival AOL appealing, such as anonymous handles, and real-time chat.

Eventually, the emergence of the Internet and the World Wide Web threatened to leave Prodigy behind.

Conversion to a true ISP

In 1994, Prodigy became the first of the early-generation dialup services to offer full access to the World Wide Web and to offer Web page hosting to its members. Since Prodigy was not a true Internet service provider, programs that needed an Internet connection, such as Internet Explorer and Quake multiplayer, could not be used with the service. Prodigy developed its own web browser, but it compared poorly to other mainstream browsers in features.

In 1995/1996 Prodigy hired Ed Bennett and Will Lansing. In 1995 through 1996 Prodigy unveiled several Internet-related products. It debuted its own real-time chat area within the service similar to AOL's. Access to USENET newsgroups was made available to Prodigy members via the Prodigy interface software. Also, Prodigy's first web presence, called Astranet, was released shortly thereafter. Astranet was to be a web-based news and information service and supported in part by advertising, though the site was considered experimental and never fully worked out its offering or business model. Another innovation was Skimmer—a market trial ISP service which became the base for the Prodigy Internet.

In 1996, with Gregory C. Carr as chair, the company retooled itself as a true Internet service provider, making its main offering Internet access branded as Prodigy Internet. This new service featured personalized web content, news alerts to pagers and Java chat. At the same time Prodigy de-emphasized its antiquated proprietary interface and its own editorial content, which were re-badged as Prodigy Classic. Prodigy Classic was discontinued in November 1999 with the official explanation that its aging software was not Y2K compliant. The service had 209,000 members when it was discontinued.

A public company
In 1996, Prodigy was acquired by the former founders of Boston Technology and their new firm International Wireless, with Mexican businessman Carlos Slim Helú, a principal owner of Telmex, as a minority investor. IBM and Sears sold their interests to this group for $200 million. It was estimated that IBM and Sears had invested more than $1 billion in the service since its founding.

Prodigy continued to operate as before, while Telmex provided Internet access under the Prodigy brand in Mexico and other parts of Latin America, with some services being provided by Prodigy Communications in the US.

Prodigy went public in 1999, trading on the NASDAQ under the symbol PRGY. Later that year, Prodigy entered a strategic partnership with SBC Communications wherein Prodigy would provide Internet services and SBC would provide exclusive sales opportunities and network, particularly DSL, facilities. The strategic partnership also gave SBC a 43% ownership interest in Prodigy.

On November 6, 2001, SBC purchased 100% interest in Prodigy and brought it private. On November 14, 2001, SBC and Yahoo! announced the strategic alliance to create the co-branded SBC Yahoo!. Sometime thereafter, SBC ceased offering new Prodigy accounts, and customers were encouraged to migrate to the SBC Yahoo! product line to the sbc.yahoo.com internet portal, while being able to keep their {username}@Prodigy.net email addresses.

Headquarters
Prodigy originally had its headquarters in White Plains Plaza in White Plains, New York. Prodigy announced that it was going to renew its lease in the White Plains Plaza in August 1992, occupying all  of space in the building. In 1992 the facility had 1,000 employees.

In 2000 the company announced that it would move its headquarters to Austin, Texas so it could more closely work with SBC Communications. During that year Prodigy leased  of space in the River Place Pointe building in northwest Austin; the building, then under construction, was scheduled to be completed in 2001. Prodigy moved its headquarters in December 2000.

Innovation
Unlike many other competing services, Prodigy started out with flat-rate pricing. When Prodigy moved to per-hour charging for its most popular services in June 1993, tens of thousands of users left the service.

Prodigy was also one of the first online services to offer a user-friendly GUI when competing services, such as CompuServe and GEnie, were still text-based. Prodigy used this graphical capability to deploy advertising, expecting it to result in a significant revenue stream.

Prodigy offered online banking, stock trading, advertising and online shopping  before the World Wide Web became widely used, but was largely unable to capitalize on these "early mover" advantages. Decades later, however, IBM continues to sell licenses for basic concepts of ecommerce.

Prodigy was a forerunner in caching data on and near the users' personal computers to minimize networking and server expenses while improving the experience for users.

Prodigy's legacy architecture was novel at the time and anticipated much of current web browser technology. It leveraged the power of the subscriber's PC to maintain session state, handle the user interface, and process applications formed from data and interpretative program objects which were largely pulled from the network when needed. At a time when in the state of the art, distributed objects were handled by RPC equivalents (remote function calls to well known servers in which final results were returned to the caller), Prodigy pioneered the concept of actually returning interpretable, "platform independent" objects to the caller for subsequent processing. This approach anticipated such things as Java applets and JavaScript. Prodigy also helped pioneer true distributed object-oriented client-server implementations as well as incidental innovations such as the equivalent of HTML Frames, pre-fetch, etc.  Prodigy patented its implementation (US 5,347,632 et al.) and these patents are highly cited among software patents.

Growth and decline
By 1994, Prodigy became a pioneer in selling "dial-up" connections to the World-Wide Web, and sold hosting services for Web publishers.

As the company shifted from its focus on its exclusive "Prodigy Classic" content and started transitioning to "Prodigy Internet" as an ISP in the late 1990s, Prodigy found itself competing with many other lower-priced ISPs, and the price didn't support the value of the Prodigy Internet exclusive content available for members.  In a letter to members, Prodigy explained that upgrades to Prodigy Classic to resolve its Y2K issues were just too expensive, and that it felt investing in Prodigy Internet was the best long term strategy, as many of the popular services offered by Prodigy Classic could be found elsewhere.  This decision was consistent with what other online service providers (AOL, CompuServe, MSN) were doing at the time, but with these providers competing primarily on ease of ISP setup rather than exclusive content, the retention value was lost, and many members found more affordable ways to access the online content and services they were used to.

In 1999 the company, now led by a cadre of ex-MCI executives with the goal of turning the brand around, became Prodigy Internet, marketing a full range of services, applications and content, including dial-up and DSL for consumers and small businesses, instant messaging, e-mail, and communities.

In 2000, with subscriber growth exploding and brand attributes at an all-time high, Prodigy explored a number of partnership deals including what would have been an unprecedented three-way merger with Earthlink and Mindspring.  Ultimately, SBC bought a 43% interest in the company, and Prodigy became the exclusive provider to SBC's 77 million high-speed Internet customers. More than a year later after the launch of Prodigy Broadband (conceived and led by Chris Spanos), SBC bought controlling interest for $465 million when Prodigy was the fourth-largest Internet service provider behind America Online, Microsoft's MSN, and EarthLink. Prodigy in 2000 was reported to have 3.1 million subscribers of its own, of which 1.3 million were DSL customers.

Attempts by SBC to sell the Prodigy brand became public knowledge on December 9, 2005.

In late 2006, SBC purchased AT&T Corporation and re-branded itself as AT&T Inc. As of early 2007, there remained within AT&T's Internet operations a small group of former Prodigy employees located in AT&T's Austin, Texas, and White Plains, New York, facilities. What had started 27 years earlier as an AT&T online experiment had come full circle.

Through 2009, the domain www.prodigy.net redirected to my.att.net, which appeared to be a Yahoo!-based content and search portal linking mostly to other online services.

AT&T stopped serving Prodigy-created webpages in 2011, severing yet another tie with the brand.

As of February 24, 2022, www.prodigy.net redirects to https://currently.att.yahoo.com.

Prodigy in Mexico
In Mexico, Prodigy Internet is the main ISP with an estimated 92% of market share. It is also the leader in WiFi (hotspots) and broadband (DSL) access. The broadband service is called Prodigy Infinitum and is available in speeds of 512 kbit/s, 1024 kbit/s, 2048 kbit/s, 4096 kbit/s and 20480 kbit/s. The installation and DSL or fiber optic modem are free and it is no longer necessary to sign a two-year service contract. Prodigy Internet in Mexico is part of Telmex (Teléfonos de México) and its sister company Telnor (Teléfonos del Noroeste).

See also
 AT&T Yahoo! – formerly SBC Yahoo!
 Stratton Oakmont, Inc. v. Prodigy Services Co.
 British Telecommunications plc v. Prodigy

References

Further reading
 "Founding Prodigy Chief Created Online Services for Consumers", Wall Street Journal obituary for Ted Papes
 "Where Online Services Go When They Die: Rebuilding Prodigy, one screen at a time" Atlantic magazine, July 12, 2014

External links
 
 
 
 Screen shots of the Prodigy login screen and games at VintageComputing.com
 Screen shots from Square Off, a Prodigy math game
 Square Off recreation by Kim Moser
 
 Recreation of the Prodigy Mad Maze game
 Prodigy Communicate, ex-user forum
 Product Design Document for Prodigy (via ZiffNet, circa 1992)

AT&T subsidiaries
Discontinued web browsers
Internet service providers of Mexico 
Internet service providers of the United States
Pre–World Wide Web online services
1999 initial public offerings
2001 mergers and acquisitions
Dot-com bubble